Pachypodium horombense is a species of Pachypodium endemic to Madagascar. The plant trunk is pachycaul, and typically short and fat.  It produces large, campanulate, yellow flowers.

Synonymy
The species was formally known as:
Pachypodium rosulatum var. horombense
It is now considered a species in section Densiflora as the floral morphology is significantly different from related species.

horombense
Endemic flora of Madagascar
Caudiciform plants